Joel Banal (born February 6, 1958) is a retired Filipino professional basketball player, and former head coach in the Philippine Basketball Association. He is the former commissioner of the now-defunct Pilipinas Commercial Basketball League (PCBL). Banal is the only head coach to win championships in the NCAA, UAAP, PBL, and the PBA.

Profile

Playing career
Banal played college ball for the Mapúa Institute of Technology, before venturing into professional basketball with the Great Taste Coffee Makers in the PBA from 1982–1985 where he got an injury. After his semi-retirement from the PBA, he worked as a circulation director of The Philippine Star.

Coaching career
His first coaching stint was for RC Cola team played in the Philippine Basketball League.

He was previously the head coach of the collegiate teams Mapua Cardinals in the NCAA, Ateneo Blue Eagles in the UAAP (won the 2002 UAAP title), the Casino Rubbing Alcohol and  Hapee Nenaco in the PBL, and the Talk 'N Text Phone Pals in the PBA, where he won championships in all of the four leagues. He is also the assistant coach of the Pasig Pirates in the Metropolitan Basketball Association.

In 2011, he replaced longtime head coach Tim Cone as coach of the Alaska Aces after serving as Cone's longtime deputy. He stepped down from the position in 2012.

Shortly after his resignation, Banal focused on his family-owned school business, Domuschola International School where he was the president until 2015.

PCBL commissioner
In 2016, Banal returned to basketball after he appointed as the league commissioner of Pilipinas Commercial Basketball League starting this 2016 Chairman's Cup. He will take over the position from Ato Badolato.

Coaching records

PBA record

Personal life
Banal is the elder brother of former Phoenix Fuel Masters head coach Koy Banal. His older brother, Conrad, served as the business writer for newspapers Philippine Daily Inquirer and The Philippine Star and was once a player for the Ateneo men's basketball team.

References

1958 births
Living people
Filipino men's basketball coaches
Mapúa Cardinals basketball players
Filipino men's basketball players
Alaska Aces (PBA) coaches
Basketball players from Manila
Great Taste Coffee Makers players
The Philippine Star people
Tagalog people
TNT Tropang Giga coaches
Ateneo Blue Eagles men's basketball coaches
Mapúa Cardinals basketball coaches